Thomas Albert Sebeok (November 9, 1920December 21, 2001) was a Hungarian-born American polymath, semiotician, and linguist. As one of the founders of the biosemiotics field, he studied non-human and cross-species signaling and communication. He is also known for his work in the development of long-time nuclear waste warning messages, in which he worked with the Human Interference Task Force (established 1981) to create methods for keeping the inhabitants of Earth away from buried nuclear waste that will still be hazardous 10,000 or more years in the future.

Early life and education 
Thomas Sebeok was born on November 9, 1920, in Budapest, Hungary. He attended secondary school at the famous Budapest-Fasori Evangélikus Gimnázium, which educated notables such as Edward Teller, John von Neumann, and Eugene Wigner. After a brief stint at Cambridge University (Magdalene College) in England, he moved to the United States at the age of 17 and became a naturalized citizen in 1944.
Sebeok earned a bachelor's degree in 1941 at the University of Chicago. He earned a master's degree in anthropological linguistics, under the external guidance of Roman Jakobson, at Princeton University in 1943 and, in 1945, a doctorate at Princeton University; his dissertation was titled Finnish and Hungarian case systems: their form and function.

Academic work 
In 1943, Sebeok started work at Indiana University in Bloomington, assisting the Amerindianist Carl Voegelin in managing the country's largest Army Specialized Training Program in foreign languages. He then created the university's department of Uralic and Altaic Studies, covering the languages of Eastern Europe, Russia and Asia. He was also the chair of the university's Research Center for Language and Semiotic Studies.

As a professor at Indiana University, Sebeok studied both human and non-human systems of signaling and communication, as well as the philosophy of mind. He was among the founders of biosemiotics, and coined the term "zoosemiotics" in 1963 to describe the development of signals and signs by non-human animal species. He also continued his work as a linguist, publishing several articles and books analyzing aspects of the Mari language (referring to it by the name "Cheremis"). His transdisciplinary work and professional collaborations spanned the fields of anthropology, biology, folklore studies, linguistics, psychology, and semiotics.

Sebeok was the editor-in-chief of the journal Semiotica, the leading periodical in the field, from its establishing in 1969 until 2001. He was also the editor of several book series and encyclopedias, including Approaches to Semiotics (over 100 volumes), Current Trends in Linguistics, and the Encyclopedic Dictionary of Semiotics.

In the early 1980s, Sebeok composed a report for the US Office of Nuclear Waste Management titled Communication Measures To Bridge Ten Millennia, discussing solutions to the problem of nuclear semiotics, a system of signs aimed at warning future civilizations from entering geographic areas contaminated by nuclear waste. The report proposed a "folkloric relay system" and the establishment of an "atomic priesthood" of physicists, anthropologists, and semioticians to create and preserve a common cultural narrative of the hazardous nature of nuclear waste sites.

In addition to his academic work, Sebeok organized hundreds of international conferences and institutes, held leadership roles in organizations such as the Linguistic Society of America, International Association for Semiotic Studies, Committee for Skeptical Inquiry, and the Semiotic Society of America, and supported the creation of linguistic and semiotics teaching programs and scholarly associations throughout the world.

Sebeok's personal library on semiotics, comprising more than 4,000 volumes of books and 700 journals, is preserved at the Department of Semiotics at the University of Tartu in Estonia. His correspondence and research files are held by the Indiana University Archives.

Personal life 
Sebeok married Mary Eleanor Lawton (1912–2005) in 1947. They had one child, Veronica C. Wald, and later divorced. Sebeok married Donna Jean Umiker (born 1946, now D. Jean Umiker-Sebeok), a fellow semiotic scholar and his frequent collaborator and co-author, in 1973, and they had two children, Jessica A. Sebeok and Erica L. Sebeok. Sebeok retired from Indiana University in 1991, but he contributed to the field of semiotics until his death in 2001.

Sebeok Fellow Award 
The Sebeok Fellow Award "recognizes outstanding contributions to the development of the doctrine of signs" and is the highest honor given by the Semiotic Society of America. It is awarded every 2 to 4 years. Recipients have included David Savan (1992), John Deely (1993), Paul Bouissac (1996), Jesper Hoffmeyer (2000), Kalevi Kull (2003), Floyd Merrell (2005), Susan Petrilli (2008), Irmengard Rauch (2011), Paul Cobley (2014), Vincent Colapietro (2018), Nathan Houser (2019), Marcel Danesi (2020).

Selected English publications

Sebeok, Thomas A., ed. Style in Language. New York and London: The Technology Press of Massachusetts Institute of Technology and John Wiley & Sons, 1960. 

Sebeok, Thomas A, Donna J. Umiker-Sebeok, and Adam Kendon. Nonverbal Communication, Interaction, and Gesture: Selections from Semiotica. The Hague: Mouton Publishers, 1981.
, 236 pages. Ten essays on methods of abductive inference in Poe's Dupin, Doyle's Holmes, Peirce and many others.
Sebeok, Thomas A, Marcia E. Erickson, Umberto Eco, V V. Ivanov, and Mônica Rector. Carnival! Berlin: Mouton Publishers, 1984.
Sebeok, Thomas A, Donna J. Umiker-Sebeok, and Evan P. Young. The Semiotic Web, 1989. Berlin: Mouton de Gruyter, 1990.
Sebeok, Thomas A, and Marcel Danesi. The Forms of Meaning: Modeling Systems Theory and Semiotic Analysis, 2000.
Sebeok, Thomas A. Signs: An Introduction to Semiotics. Toronto, Ont: University of Toronto Press, 2001.

References

External links
Thomas Sebeok papers, 1940-2001 and undated at the Indiana University Archives.
Indiana University School of Library and Information Science Press Release: "Thomas A. Sebeok, Senior Fellow at SLIS, Passes On 
"The Estonian Connection" by Thomas A. Sebeok 

Hungarian emigrants to the United States
University of Chicago alumni
Princeton University alumni
American semioticians
1920 births
2001 deaths
American skeptics
Linguists of Muskogean languages
Linguistic Society of America presidents
Presidents of the Semiotic Society of America